Turkish Airlines Flight 835 was a scheduled domestic passenger flight from Adana Şakirpaşa Airport, Adana to Esenboğa International Airport, Ankara, Turkey.

There were 25 passengers and four crew on board, of which 24 passengers and all four crew members were killed in the accident.

The probable cause of the accident was that the aircraft was not in the normal flying pattern and was well below its designated altitude.

References

Turkish Airlines Ankara 1961
Aviation accidents and incidents in Turkey
835
Accidents and incidents involving the Fokker F27
20th century in Ankara
Turkish Airlines Ankara 1961
September 1961 events in Europe
1961 disasters in Turkey